Henry Templeton (born 25 June 1963) is a Scottish former professional association footballer. Templeton played as a winger for Airdrieonians, Ayr United, Clydebank, Queen of the South and Frickley Athletic. 

He is the father of footballer David Templeton.

Playing career
Templeton is best remembered for his time at Ayr United where he played most. There he formed part of a potent attacking trio along with Tommy Walker and John Sludden. Led by ex-Scotland manager Ally MacLeod, in 1987–88 Ayr were Second Division champions and Scotland's highest league scorers. The start of his final season at Somerset Park was interrupted by an injury sustained in a Scottish League Cup defeat to Celtic in August 1990, though he recovered to take part in the 1990 Scottish Challenge Cup Final only to finish on the losing side. In February 1991 he was sold on to Clydebank, staying for only six months before joining Queen of the South. In 2007, Templeton was inducted into the Ayr United Hall of Fame.

Not having led a healthy lifestyle, by the time Templeton joined Queen of the South his talents were waning, as were the club, now approaching the end of a long decline before the Norman Blount takeover. Again playing for Ally MacLeod, Templeton's time in Dumfries is best remembered for the emergence of prolific striker Andy Thomson.

Honours
Ayr United
 Scottish Second Division: 1987–88

References

1963 births
Footballers from Glasgow
Living people
Association football forwards
Scottish footballers
Airdrieonians F.C. (1878) players
Clydebank F.C. (1965) players
Glasgow United F.C. players
Ayr United F.C. players
Queen of the South F.C. players
Frickley Athletic F.C. players
Scottish Football League players
Scottish Junior Football Association players